Cirkuše (in older sources also Cerkovišče) is a small settlement south of Vače in the Municipality of Litija in central Slovenia. The area is part of the traditional region of Upper Carniola. It is now included with the rest of the municipality in the Central Sava Statistical Region; until January 2014 the municipality was part of the Central Slovenia Statistical Region.

References

External links

Cirkuše on Geopedia

Populated places in the Municipality of Litija